Delerium is a Canadian new-age ambient electronic musical duo that formed in 1987, originally as a side project of the influential industrial music act Front Line Assembly. Throughout the band’s history, their musical style has encompassed a broad range, including dark ethereal ambient trance, voiceless industrial soundscapes, and electronic pop music. They are best known for their worldwide hit "Silence". The band is known to feature female guest vocalists on their albums since their 1994 album Semantic Spaces.

Members and history
Delerium has traditionally been a two-person project, but the only constant member throughout its history has been Bill Leeb. Leeb was an early member of industrial dance pioneers Skinny Puppy, but after he left in 1986 he went on to create his own project, Front Line Assembly with collaborator Michael Balch. Later, the two worked on the side project Delerium and released their first album, Faces, Forms & Illusions. After Balch left both Front Line Assembly and Delerium, Leeb worked with Rhys Fulber, and the two released several albums under the Delerium moniker; these years saw a gradual stylistic change from darker ambient to a more danceable sound. After the release of Karma, Fulber left to pursue other interests, and Leeb teamed up with producer Chris Peterson to release Poem. 2003, however, saw the reunion of Leeb and Fulber for the release of Chimera, followed by Nuages du Monde in 2006.

In contrast to Leeb and collaborators' other projects, Delerium has included several guest vocalists since the release of Semantic Spaces. These have included mostly women, such as Kristy Thirsk (of Rose Chronicles), Sarah McLachlan, Leigh Nash (of Sixpence None the Richer), Elsieanne Caplette (of Elsiane), Lisa Gerrard (sampled only), Jaël (of Swiss band Lunik), Camille Henderson, Nerina Pallot, Emily Haines (of Metric), Jacqui Hunt (of Single Gun Theory), Isabel Bayrakdarian and Shelley Harland. Other than Leeb, only three males have contributed vocals to a Delerium album: Matthew Sweet ("Daylight", on Poem), Greg Froese ("Apparition", on Nuages du Monde), and Michael Logen ("Days Turn into Nights", on Music Box Opera); in addition, the noted griot Baaba Maal was sampled ("Awakenings, on "Spiritual Archives").

The Mediæval Bæbes provided the vocal track for, and starred in the video of, Aria; the vocals are an adapted version of the vocals from "All Turns to Yesterday" on the Bæbes' Worldes Blysse album. They are also featured on two tracks from Delerium's 2006 album, Nuages du Monde.

Although it may be argued that Front Line Assembly has the largest cult following of all Leeb and associates projects, Delerium is undoubtedly the most financially successful. In addition to these two mainstays, related collaborations between Leeb and Fulber, Peterson, and/or Balch include Equinox, Intermix, Noise Unit, Pro-Tech, and Synæsthesia, among others. In addition, in 2007 Leeb and Fulber collaborated with Leigh Nash under the name Fauxliage. Rhys Fulber has also maintained a solo project Conjure One since his temporary exit from Delerium.

Music

The single "Silence", featuring vocals by Sarah McLachlan, reached number three on the UK music charts. In 2000, three years after Karma was released, notable DJs such as Tiësto and Airscape produced remixes of "Silence", which generated interest and gained considerable radio airplay for the original track, albeit most airplay was for the remixes.

In 2003, Delerium embarked on their first tour, with vocals performed by Kristy Thirsk and Shelley Harland. In January 2005, Delerium performed at the One World benefit concert in Vancouver for the 2004 Asian tsunami, where "Silence" was performed live for the first time with Sarah McLachlan. The song has been described as one of the greatest trance songs of all time.

Awards 
Delerium has received two Juno Awards for Best Dance Recording: in 1998 for "Euphoria (Rabbit in the Moon Mix)", and in 2000 for "Silence".

Discography

Albums / EPs
 Faces, Forms & Illusions (Dossier, 1989), LP / CD
 Morpheus (Dossier, 1989), LP / CD
 Syrophenikan (Dossier, 1990), LP / CD
 Stone Tower (Dossier, 1991), LP / CD
 Spiritual Archives (Dossier, 1991), CD
 Euphoric (Third Mind, 1991), EP / CD
 Spheres (Dossier, 1994), CD
 Semantic Spaces (Nettwerk, 1994), CD (August 23)
 Spheres 2 (Dossier, 1994), CD
 Karma (Nettwerk, 1997), LP / CD (April 22)
 Poem (Nettwerk, 2000), LP / CD (November 21)
 Chimera (Nettwerk, 2003), CD (June 24)
 Nuages du Monde (Nettwerk, 2006), CD (October 3)
 Music Box Opera (Nettwerk, 2012), CD (October 30)
 Mythologie (Metropolis Records, 2016), LP/CD (September 23)
 Signs (Metropolis Records, 2023), LP/CD (March 10)

Singles

Compilations
 Reflections I (Dossier, 1995), CD
 Reflections II (Dossier, 1995), CD
 Archives I (Nettwerk, 2002), 2CD
 Archives II (Nettwerk, 2002), 2CD
 Odyssey: The Remix Collection (Nettwerk, 2001), 2CD
 The Best Of (Nettwerk, 2004), CD
 Remixed: The Definitive Collection (Nettwerk, 2010), CD
 Voice (An Acoustic Collection) (Nettwerk, 5 Oct. 2010) CD
 Rarities & B-Sides (Nettwerk, 21 April 2015)

Online exclusive
 "Above the Clouds" (2003), a download-only song featuring Shelley Harland available through iTunes Music Store and other online music stores

Music videos
 "Flowers Become Screens" (1994)
 "Incantation" (1994)
 "Euphoria (Firefly)" (1997)
 "Duende" (1997)
 "Silence" (Airscape Mix) (2000)
 "Underwater" (Rank 1 Remix) (2000)
 "Aria" (2000)
 "Innocente" (Lost Witness Remix) (2001)
 "Underwater" (Above & Beyond's 21st Century Remix) (2002)
 "After All" (2003)
 "After All" (Svenson & Gielen Edit) (2003)
 "Angelicus" (2007)
 "Lost and Found" (2007)
 "Dust in Gravity" (2009)
 "Dust in Gravity (Sultan & Ned Shepard Remix)" (2009)
 "Monarch" (2012)
 "Days Turn into Nights" (2013)
 "Chrysalis Heart" (2013)
 "Glimmer" (2015)
 "Stay" (2018)

Remixes
 Tara MacLean – "Divided" (2000)
 Sarah Brightman – "A Whiter Shade of Pale" (2001)
 Sasha Lazard – "Awakening" (2002)
 Clint Mansell – "Requiem for a Dream Soundtrack - Deluxed" (2002)
 Lunik – "Waiting" (2003)
 Phildel – "Comfort Me" (2013)

Third-party compilations that include Delerium
 Space Daze: The History & Mystery of Electronic Ambient Space Rock (Cleopatra, 1994), 2CD (featured the song "Dark Matter" from the album Spheres).
 The Crow: Stairway to Heaven, 1998 (featured the song "Silence" in one episode).
 Brokedown Palace Soundtrack (Island, 1999), CD (prominently featured "Silence").
 Tomb Raider Soundtrack (Elektra / Wea, 2001), CD (featured a slightly stripped "Laras mix" of "Terra Firma").
 Best of Mystera (Polys, 2000), 2CD
 Doctor Death's Volume IV: The Marvels of Insect Life (C'est la Mort, 1990) CD (featured the song "A Certain Trust").
 Faeries: A Musical Companion to the Art of Brian Froud (RCA, 2002) CD (featured the song "Nature's Kingdom").

See also
 Fauxliage — a musical project made by members of the Canadian electronic music group Delerium and Leigh Nash in 2007.
 List of ambient music artists
 List of artists who reached number one on the U.S. dance chart

References

External links
 [ Delerium] at Billboard.com
 Mindphaser.com Delerium, Front Line Assembly, Conjure One, Decree and side projects website.
 

Canadian house music groups
Canadian techno music groups
Canadian ambient music groups
Worldbeat groups
Musical groups from Vancouver
Musical groups established in 1987
Remixers
Juno Award for Dance Recording of the Year winners
Third Mind Records artists
1987 establishments in British Columbia
Nettwerk Music Group artists